Feodosy Vanin (25 February 1914 – 26 December 2009) was a Soviet long-distance runner. He competed in the marathon at the 1952 Summer Olympics.

References

External links
 

1914 births
2009 deaths
Athletes (track and field) at the 1952 Summer Olympics
Soviet male long-distance runners
Soviet male marathon runners
Olympic athletes of the Soviet Union